The WBSC Americas, formerly known as Pan American Baseball Confederation (COPABE, Spanish: Confederación Panamericana de Béisbol, Portuguese: Confederação Pan-Americana de Beisebol), is the governing body of baseball and softball within the Americas.

History
Talks of the need of a baseball confederation in the Americas sparked with the founding of the Confederation of European Baseball back in the 1950s, although it was not until 1984, during the World Cup played in Cuba, that 12 countries of the Americas finally voted in favor of a formation of a confederation.

The first ever Confederación Panamericana de Béisbol (COPABE) executive meeting was held in March 1985, and 11 countries participated in its first ever Congress on March 15. The Congress saw the election of Oswaldo Matias Flores (Cuba) as the first president of the organization.

On October 5, 1987, the first Pan American Championship was played (Cuba won the tournament). The day after the final game of the tournament was held, the Congress elected Edwin Zerpa Pizzorno (Venezuela) as the next president of the organization.

In the late 1980s and early 1990s COPABE concentrated on developing tournaments at the youth level all over the Americas.

Members

Baseball

Softball

WBSC World Rankings

Baseball

Softball

Baseball5

Historical leaders
Highest Ranked Americas member in the WBSC Rankings

Men's baseball

Women's baseball

Men's softball

Women's softball

See also
World Baseball Softball Confederation
Baseball at the Central American and Caribbean Games
Baseball at the Pan American Games
Baseball at the 2010 South American Games
2008 Copa América (baseball)
Baseball awards#Americas
Latin American Series
Caribbean Series
South American Baseball Championship

References

External links
Official website
Pan American Baseball Confederation website (on WorldNews (WN) Network domain)

Baseball governing bodies
Baseball Confederation
Sports organizations established in 1985
Pan-American sports governing bodies
Baseball in the Americas
Americas